Abdou Achouba (b. 1950 in Rabat) is a Moroccan-Italian filmmaker, journalist, film critic and producer. He has presided over the jury of short films at the Moroccan National Film Festival.  He studied political science, then cinema at the IDHEC in Paris.

Filmography

Feature films 
 Kane Ya Kane (1977, documentary)
 Taghounja (1980)
 Saadati Aissawa (1982, documentary)

Short films 
 Flip Paradise (1979)

References

External links 
 

Living people
1950 births